Isaac Nana Eshun  (born 15 January 1969 in Sekondi-Takoradi) is a retired Ghanaian professional football forward who played in Ghana and Europe.

Club career
Eshun had a brief spell in the Turkish Super Lig with Eskişehirspor.

International career
Eshun played for the Ghana national football team in Olympic qualifying matches.

References

External links
 Wormatia Worms Profile

1969 births
Living people
Ghanaian footballers
Eskişehirspor footballers
Expatriate footballers in Turkey
Rot-Weiss Essen players
1. FC Union Solingen players
Expatriate footballers in Germany
Wormatia Worms players
Bonner SC players
Ghanaian expatriate sportspeople in Turkey
Association football forwards